The 2019–20 CONCACAF Nations League A was the top division of the 2019–20 edition of the CONCACAF Nations League, the inaugural season of the international football competition involving the men's national teams of the 41 member associations of CONCACAF. League A culminated with the final championship in June 2021 to crown the inaugural champions of the CONCACAF Nations League.

Format
League A consisted of twelve teams, with the six participants of the 2018 FIFA World Cup qualifying hexagonal joined by the top six teams from qualifying. The league was split into four groups of three teams. The teams competed in a home-and-away, round-robin format over the course of the group phase, with matches played in the official FIFA match windows in September, October and November 2019. The four group winners qualified to the Nations League final championship, while the four last-placed teams in each group were relegated to League B for the next edition of the tournament.

The Nations League Finals took place in June 2021, and was played in a knockout format in the United States, the centralized location selected by CONCACAF. The four teams played the semi-finals, with the matchups determined by the group stage rankings (1 vs 4 and 2 vs 3), followed by the third place match and the final (Regulations Articles 12.8 and 12.10).

In September 2019, it was announced that the Nations League would also provide qualification for the 2021 CONCACAF Gold Cup. The top two teams from each of the four League A groups qualified for the Gold Cup, while the third-placed teams entered the first round of Gold Cup qualification.

Seeding
Teams were seeded into the pots of League A according to their position in the November 2018 CONCACAF Ranking Index.

The draw for the group phase took place at The Chelsea in Las Vegas, Nevada, United States on 27 March 2019, 22:00 EDT (19:00 local time, PDT).

Groups
The fixture list was confirmed by CONCACAF on 21 May 2019.

Times are EDT/EST, as listed by CONCACAF (local times, if different, are in parentheses).

Group A

Group B

Group C

Group D

Nations League Finals

Seeding

Bracket

Semi-finals

Third place play-off

Final

Goalscorers

Notes

References

External links

League A